The Kuala Lumpur Stock Exchange (KLSE) dates back to 1930 when the Singapore Stockbrokers' Association was set up as a formal organisation dealing in securities in Malaya. In 1937, it was re-registered as the Malayan Stockbrokers' Association, but it still did not trade public shares.

By 1960, the Malayan Stock Exchange was formed and public trading of shares began on 9 May.  In 1961, the Board system was introduced whereby two trading rooms, one each in Singapore and Kuala Lumpur, were linked by direct telephone lines into a single market with the same stocks and shares listed at a single set of prices on both boards.

The Stock Exchange of Malaysia was officially formed in 1964 and in the following year, with the secession of Singapore from Malaysia, the common stock exchange continued to function under the name Stock Exchange of Malaysia and Singapore (SEMS).

In 1973, with the termination of currency interchangeability between Malaysia and Singapore, the SEMS was separated into the Kuala Lumpur Stock Exchange Bhd (KLSEB) and the Stock Exchange of Singapore (SES).  Malaysian companies continued to be listed on SES and vice versa.  A new company limited by guarantee, The Kuala Lumpur Stock Exchange (KLSE) took over operations of KLSEB as the stock exchange. In 1994, it was renamed Kuala Lumpur Stock Exchange.

It also fully suspended the trading of CLOB (Central Limit Order Book) counters, indefinitely freezing approximately US$4.47 billion worth of shares and affecting 172,000 investors, most of them Singaporeans.
 
Kuala Lumpur Stock Exchange became a demutualised exchange and was renamed Bursa Malaysia in 2004.  It consists of a Main Board, a Second Board and MESDAQ (now ACE Market) with total market capitalization of (USD$397.39 billion).

References

External links
Bursa Malaysia (formerly known as Kuala Lumpur Stock Exchange) official website
Bursa Malaysia An article about Bursa Malaysia from TalkMalaysia.com

Economy of Kuala Lumpur
Bursa Malaysia
Stock exchanges in Malaysia